The 32nd Annual Tony Awards was broadcast by CBS television on June 4, 1978, from the Shubert Theatre in New York City. This was the first time that CBS broadcast the ceremony, which had previously been shown on the ABC television network.

The ceremony
Presenters were Ed Asner, Mikhail Baryshnikov, Carol Channing, Bonnie Franklin, Robert Guillaume, Julie Harris, Helen Hayes, Bob Hope, Gene Kelly, Linda Lavin, Jack Lemmon, Hal Linden, Roy Scheider and Dick Van Patten.

Bonnie Franklin introduced each segment from her seat in the audience. Bob Hope presented the "Lawrence Langer" Special Award to Irving Berlin, who was not present at the ceremony. The theme of the ceremony was "footlights", with each presenter telling of the first time they saw live theatre.

Musicals represented: 
 The Act ("City Lights" – Liza Minnelli and Company)
 Ain't Misbehavin' ("Ladies Who Sing with the Band"/"Off Time" – Company)
 Dancin' ("Sing, Sing, Sing" – Company)
 On the Twentieth Century ("On The Twentieth Century" – Company)
 Runaways (Medley – Company)

Winners and nominees
Winners are in bold

Special awards
Lawrence Langner Memorial Award for Distinguished Lifetime Achievement in the American Theatre – Irving Berlin
Theatre Award '78 – To the creators, Charles Moss and Stan Dragoti (of Wells, Rich, Greene, Inc.) of the I Love New York Broadway Show Tours and William S. Doyle, Deputy Commissioner, the New York State Department of Commerce
Regional Theatre Award – The Long Wharf Theatre, New Haven, Connecticut

Multiple nominations and awards

These productions had multiple nominations:

9 nominations: On the Twentieth Century 
7 nominations: Dancin'
6 nominations: The Act and Working 
5 nominations: Ain't Misbehavin', Dracula and Runaways  
4 nominations: Chapter Two, Da, Deathtrap, The Gin Game and Timbuktu! 
2 nominations: The Mighty Gents, Tartuffe and A Touch of the Poet   

The following productions received multiple awards.

5 wins: On the Twentieth Century  
4 wins: Da
3 wins: Ain't Misbehavin'
2 wins: Dancin' and Dracula

See also
 Drama Desk Awards
 1978 Laurence Olivier Awards – equivalent awards for West End theatre productions
 Obie Award
 New York Drama Critics' Circle
 Theatre World Award
 Lucille Lortel Awards

References

External links
Tony Awards Official Site

Tony Awards ceremonies
1978 theatre awards
Tony
1978 in New York City
1970s in Manhattan